Marsh Creek may refer to:

Watercourses in the United States
Marsh Creek (California), a tributary of the San Joaquin River
Marsh Creek (Missouri), a tributary of the St. Francis River
Marsh Creek (New York), Broome County, New York, United States
Marsh Creek (Crabtree Creek tributary), a stream in North Carolina
Marsh Creek (Bowman Creek tributary), Wyoming County, Pennsylvania
Marsh Creek (Brandywine Creek), a tributary of Brandywine Creek in Pennsylvania
Marsh Creek (Monocacy River tributary), a tributary of the Monocacy River in Pennsylvania
Marsh Creek (Pine Creek tributary), a tributary of Pine Creek in Pennsylvania
Marsh Creek (Rogers Creek tributary), Luzerne County, Pennsylvania, the United States
Rogers Creek (Pennsylvania), also known as Marsh Creek, a tributary of Huntington Creek in Luzerne County
Marsh Creek (Portneuf River), a tributary of the Portneuf River, Idaho

Populated place
Marsh Creek, Missouri, an unincorporated community

See also
 Marsh (disambiguation)
 Marsh River (disambiguation)